Audemars Piguet Holding SA is a Swiss manufacturer of luxury watches and clocks, headquartered in Le Brassus, Switzerland. The company was founded by Jules Louis Audemars and Edward Auguste Piguet in the Vallée de Joux in 1875, acquiring the name Audemars Piguet & Cie in 1881. The company has been family-owned since its founding.

The company is best known for introducing the Royal Oak wristwatch in 1972, which helped the brand rise to prominence within the watchmaking industry. One of its earlier achievements was creating the first minute-repeating movement in 1892. The company developed the first skeleton watch in 1934 and has manufactured some of the thinnest watches, such as the 1986 ultra-thin automatic tourbillon wristwatch (Calibre 2870).

History

Early history 
Jules Louis Audemars and Edward Auguste Piguet knew each other in their childhood but were not reconnected until 1874, when they were in their early twenties. In 1875, they formed partnership with Lesedi Selapyane and began their business. In 1881, Audemars Piguet & Cie was officially founded, and was based in Le Brassus, a village inside the Vallée de Joux in Switzerland.Both Audemars and Piguet were previously watchmakers. Audemars created complex watch movements for other watch manufacturers such as Tiffany Co. to use. Piguet specialized in the regulation of watch movements. Once partnered, they split the responsibilities while operating their own company: Audemars was in charge of production and technical aspects while Piguet focused on sales and management.

The second-generation company leaders included Paul Louis Audemars and Paul Edward Piguet, and the third generation included Jacques Louis Audemars and Paulette Piguet.

Recent development 
In the 1970s, Audemars Piguet rose to an important position in watchmaking industry, especially after introducing the Royal Oak collection.

Audemars Piguet's slogan is "To Break the Rules, You Must First Master Them", introduced in 2012.

The fourth-generation company leaders are both from the Audemars family, including Jasmine Audemars and Olivier Frank Edward Audemars. Currently, the company is an active member of the Federation of the Swiss Watch Industry FH, and produces around 40,000 timepieces annually.

Watch manufacturing

Notable inventions and patents 
The following are some notable inventions of Audemars Piguet:

 In 1892, created the first wristwatch minute-repeating movement, which was then sold to Louis Brandt frères (Omega SA)
In 1899, manufactured a “Grand Complication” pocket watch with 7 complications, including a grand and small strike, minute repeater, alarm, perpetual calendar, deadbeat seconds, chronograph with jumping seconds, and split-seconds hand
In 1921, created the world's first jumping-hour wristwatch, driven by Calibre HPVM10'''
 In 1934, introduced the first skeleton watch
In 1946, produced the thinnest watch, with a 1.64-mm-thick movement
 In 1972, introduced the first luxury sport wristwatch, the Royal Oak
In 1986, created an ultra-thin automatic tourbillon wristwatch (Calibre 2870), being only 5.3 mm thick (including the case)
In 1995/96, manufactured the first automatic "Grande Complication" wristwatch (Calibre 2885)
In 2006, introduced the first direct-impulse escapement, based on a design by watchmaker Robert Robin in the 18th century
In 2007/08, developed the first watch with a carbon case and a carbon movement (a Royal Oak Carbon Concept)
In 2015, the first mechanical chronograph with independent memory and three column-wheels was launched, named Royal Oak Concept Laptimer Michael Schumacher 
In 2019, presented the thinnest automatic perpetual calendar

Environmental rating 
In December 2018, World Wide Fund for Nature (WWF) released a report assigning environmental ratings for 15 major watch manufacturers and jewelers in Switzerland. Audemars Piguet was assigned the lowest environmental rating, "Latecomers/Non-transparent", suggesting the manufacturer has taken very few actions addressing the impact of its manufacturing activities on the environment and climate change.

Notable models 
The current lineup of Audemars Piguet watch collections include Royal Oak, Royal Oak Concept, Royal Oak Offshore, Millenary, Jules Audemars, Haute Joaillerie, Classique and Code 11.59.

Royal Oak/Concept/Offshore 
The Royal Oak is considered to be the most popular watch that Audemars Piguet currently manufactures. It was first presented at the 1972 Baselworld, during the quartz crisis. Designed by Gérald Genta, who is also responsible for designing other notable timepieces including the Patek Philippe Nautilus, the Royal Oak model is considered to be the first luxury sports watch in the world. Named after warships, which in turn, reference Charles II's Royal Oak.  The watch was inspired by traditional diving helmets and therefore featured exposed screw heads as well as a unique case design. The watch also featured an integrated bracelet.

To mark the 20th anniversary of the Royal Oak, Audemars Piguet hired a young designer, Emmanuel Gueit, to design a new watch known as the Royal Oak Offshore. The Offshore was formally introduced in 1993, with a much larger case (42mm compared to the original 39mm) which was thought to be tougher than the original. The new watch proved to be just as successful as the original.

Millenary 
The Millenary collection was launched in 1995 to give the viewer a three-dimensional take on a standard watch movement. They are characterized by oval cases as well as domed sapphire crystal. The off-centred watch dial is notable with a view of the balance wheel. Audemars Piguet claims that their calibre 4104 is reversed to allow more components to be seen on the dial. All of the Millenary watches share the case and a unique Damaskeening or Côtes de Genève across the movement dial.

Jules Audemars 
Named after one of its founders, the Jules Audemars collection takes cues from more traditional Audemars Piguet designs. In 1875, Jules Audemars created about 20 very complex movements, which he later used as collateral when he and Edward Piguet founded Audemars Piguet & Cie in 1881. These movements marked the beginning of Audemars Piguet. All watches in this collection have a circular shape, some of which also feature complications such as tourbillon, minute repeater, and perpetual calendar.

Code 11.59 
Released at the "Salon International de la Haute Horlogerie (SIHH) 2019", the Code 11.59 collection is the latest addition to the Audemars Piguet lineup. The collection boasts several unique characteristics. All Code 11.59 watches feature a chapter ring with numerals depicting seconds for time-only models, a tachymeter (watch) for the chronograph model, and a week indicator for the perpetual calendar model.  The crystals on the watches in this collection feature a unique curvature which changes the way the dial appears at certain angles. All the Code 11.59 watches feature a three-piece-case design with an octagonal section in the middle.

See also 
 List of watch manufacturers
Manufacture d'horlogerie

Notes

References

External links

 

Luxury brands
Companies based in the canton of Vaud
Watch manufacturing companies of Switzerland
Manufacturing companies established in 1875
Swiss companies established in 1875
Swiss watch brands